Garret Parkes (born 22 July 1991) is a professional surfer from Byron Bay, Australia.

The Association of Surfing Professionals, ASP, gave Garrett a Qualification Series, QS, ranking of 31st in the world in 2014. He had seven QS Heat wins in 2014. He is currently sponsored by the DHD surfing team.

References

 https://www.monsterchildren.com/71977/australian-army-best-surfer-garrett-parkes/
 https://www.northernstar.com.au/news/apn-garrets/14906/
 http://www.globalsurftag.com/powerwave/

1991 births
Living people
People from the Northern Rivers
Australian surfers
Sportsmen from New South Wales
World Surf League surfers